Dongsheng Township is a township Wangkui County in west-central Heilongjiang province, China, located  northeast of the county seat. , it has 6 villages under its administration.

See also 
 List of township-level divisions of Heilongjiang

References 

Township-level divisions of Heilongjiang